This is a list of players who have played international football for the Scotland national football team and who were born outside Scotland. For the purposes of international football, the global governing body FIFA considers Scotland, England, Wales and Northern Ireland to be distinct and individual countries. This has happened since the early days of international football, as Arthur Kinnaird, 11th Lord Kinnaird (born in England) and Henry Renny-Tailyour represented Scotland in the 1870s. The first black international football player, Andrew Watson, was born in British Guiana and represented Scotland during the 1880s.

The majority of these players were born in England. In a friendly match against Cyprus in November 2011, five of the sixteen players used by Scotland were born in England. The rules of selection were quite strict until 1971, when national teams were allowed to pick players if one of their parents were born in that country. This was later relaxed to allowing selection for one grandparent being born in Scotland, although it was temporarily tightened again, which prevented Nigel Spackman from playing for Scotland. The Home Nations have since made an agreement that also allows players who have been educated for at least five years in the relevant country to be selected by its national team. Jordan Rhodes was selected on this basis.

Australia
Lyndon Dykes
Willie Fraser

British Guiana
Andrew Watson

Canada
Eadie Fraser
Joe Kennaway
John Little

England

Notes

Only played in England
A large number of Scottish internationals born in Scotland never played senior club football in that country, either due to the circumstances of their upbringing; for example Alex Donaldson, Jimmy Nelson (raised in Belfast rather than England, settled in Wales after playing for Cardiff City), Tommy Lawrence, Scot Gemmill, Dominic Matteo, Richard Hughes and Ikechi Anya (who also played in the Spanish leagues), or being scouted by clubs in England at a young age and remaining in the English football league system throughout their career; this includes several who reached the landmark of 25 caps such as Billy Liddell, Denis Law, Billy Bremner, Willie Donachie, Asa Hartford, Frank Gray, John Robertson, John Wark, Colin Calderwood, Darren Fletcher and Grant Hanley.

Conversely, Joe Baker had only played in the Scottish football league system when he was capped by his birthplace England in 1959 – he was the first player to be in that situation. His elder brother Gerry Baker was also raised in Scotland but had been born in the United States and later appeared for their national team.

India
Henry Renny-Tailyour
Paul Wilson

Ireland
Willie Maley

Isle of Man
The Isle of Man does not have an internationally recognised national team; the Isle of Man Football Association is affiliated to the English Football Association as a County Football Association.
Kieran Tierney

Malaysia
Shaun Maloney

South Africa
Alex Bell
John Hewie

Sweden
Richard Gough

United States
Jimmy Walker

See also
Australia players born in Scotland
England players born in Scotland
Republic of Ireland players born in Scotland
United States players born in Scotland
Wales players born in Scotland

References

Scotland
Born outside Scotland
Association football player non-biographical articles
Scottish diaspora
Immigration to Scotland
Scotland